Rajasthan United Football Club is an Indian professional football club based in Jaipur, Rajasthan. Founded in 2018 as JECRC CF, the club academy participated in R-League A Division 2019, and was the inaugural winner. In 2020, JECRC CF was rebranded as Rajasthan United FC. The club currently competes in I-League. Rajasthan United won the 2021 I-League Qualifiers and thus became the first ever club from the state to qualify for the then top flight of Indian football.

History 
Rajasthan United FC is the premier professional football club based in Jaipur. The club was founded in 2018 by an engineering student Kamal Singh Saroha, with his colleagues and friends as JECRC CF (Jaipur Engineering College and Research Centre), and re-branded as Rajasthan United in 2020, after the introduction of Rajat Mishra and Swapnil Dhaka as the co-founders. In its first year of inception, they managed to win the R-League A Division. In the second season, United came out as runners-up and earned a spot for the I-League qualifiers.

In collaboration with Witty International School, they set up its residential football academy in Bhilwara. In 2021, United were crowned champions of the I-League Qualifiers, thus becoming the first club from Rajasthan to qualify for the I-League. In December, the club appointed Spanish manager Francesc Bonet as new head coach.

On 26 December 2021, they made their I-League debut against RoundGlass Punjab with only nine players, in which they were defeated by 2–0. United later roped in former La Liga player Mauro dos Santos of Argentina. The club reached championship stage of 2021–22 I-League and ended their campaign as sixth in league table.

Rajasthan United began their 2022–23 season campaign at the 131st edition of Durand Cup on 20 August with a magnificent 3–2 win against Indian Super League side ATK Mohun Bagan. The club moved to the quarter-finals, defeating Indian Navy in the final group game, but was eliminated losing 3–1 to Hyderabad at the end. In November, the club reached final of Baji Rout Cup in Odisha, in which they clinched title defeating Churchill Brothers in penalty shootout. When the 2022–23 I-League began, the club again faced Churchill Brothers in their first match, and earned three points with 2–1 win. In December, the club participated in Dausa Gold Cup in Rajasthan, in which they finished as runners-up after 1–0 defeat to FC Kerala.

Stadiums 
Rajasthan United FC use Rajasthan University Sports Complex in Jaipur as their home ground, and sometimes the Witty Sports Club ground. In October 2022, the club announced that they will use Ambedkar Stadium in New Delhi for matches of 2022–23 I-League, as the traditional home and away games format was reinstalled.

Crest 
The club's crest features historical monuments of Rajasthan, Maharana Pratap and Thar desert in background with R.U.F.C. monogram. It symbolises rich and royal culture and heritage of Rajasthan.

Kit manufacturer and shirt sponsors

Players

First-team squad

Out on loan

Personnel

Current technical staff

Team records 

Key

Tms. = Number of teams
Pos. = Position in league
Attendance/G = Average league attendance

AIFF competitions

Head coaching record

Notable players

Past and present internationals 
The players below have senior/youth international cap(s) for their respective countries. Players whose name is listed, represented their countries before or after playing for Rajasthan United FC.

 Komron Tursunov (2021–2022)
  Mauro dos Santos (2022)
  Aidar Mambetaliev (2022–)
  Youssef Atriss (2022–2023)
  Martín Cháves (2022–2023)
  Nuha Marong (2022–2023)
  Atay Dzhumashev (2022–)

Honours

League
I-League 2nd Division
Champions (1): 2021
 Rajasthan State Men's League
Champions (1): 2019
Runners-up (1): 2021

Cup
Baji Rout Cup
Champions (1): 2022
Dausa Gold Cup
Runners-up (1): 2022
Captain Pratap Singh Memorial Cup
Runners-up (1): 2023

RUFC youth
Youth football is practiced in Rajasthan United FC, and their U17 team for the first time, took part in the 2022–23 U-17 Youth Cup in January 2023.

Honours
Rajasthan U-17 Senior Open Tournament
Runners-up (1): 2022–23

See also

 List of football clubs in India

Footnotes

References

External links 
Rajasthan United FC at Global Sports Archive

Rajasthan United FC at WorldFootball.net
Rajasthan United FC at Sofascore

Football clubs in Rajasthan
Association football clubs established in 2018
2018 establishments in Rajasthan
I-League clubs
I-League 2nd Division clubs
Rajasthan United FC